Omar is a 2013 Palestinian drama film directed by Hany Abu-Assad. It was screened in the Un Certain Regard section at the 2013 Cannes Film Festival where it won the Special Jury Prize. It was shown at the 2013 Toronto International Film Festival. The film was nominated for the Best Foreign Language Film at the 86th Academy Awards. It won Best Feature Film at the 2013 Asia Pacific Screen Awards. The film was screened at the United Nations in New York on 1 May 2014.

Plot 
Omar is a Palestinian baker who frequently climbs the West Bank barrier to visit his lover, Nadia, a high-school girl whom he intends to marry. Omar and his childhood friends, Tarek and Amjad, have been practising attacks on soldiers. Caught in one of his crossings, Omar is beaten and humiliated by Israeli soldiers. The three later shoot a soldier dead in a night time attack on a checkpoint, with Amjad acting as the sniper. Later, Omar and his friends are pursued by the Israeli authorities who have been tipped off about him and Omar is captured. After being tortured by an agent named Rami, Omar is tricked into incriminating himself. Facing life in prison, Omar secures his release in exchange for aiding in the detention of Tarek, whom Rami says he believes killed the soldier.

Due to his release, Omar is suspected of being a collaborator and stigmatized. Omar's situation is worsened because Nadia is Tarek's sister. Due to Omar's delays in helping with Tarek's capture, he is pursued by the Israelis and is rearrested when a planned operation is betrayed, resulting in the deaths of four militants. Other prisoners attack him as they believe he is a traitor and he makes a second deal with Rami. He confronts Amjad who admits betraying them and says that Nadia is pregnant with his child, dishonouring both of them, and that the Israelis used that to blackmail him. Omar forces Amjad to confess to Tarek, who tries to kill him. In the ensuing struggle, Tarek is killed when his gun accidentally goes off. With Rami's help, Omar and Amjad hide their involvement in his death.

Two years later, Omar visits Nadia and discovers Amjad was lying about having an affair with her but is now married to her and they have two children. She still loves Omar who also learns that Amjad did not deliver a letter she wrote to Omar before her marriage. He is visited by Rami who attempts to coerce him into killing a leading militant. Omar promises his assistance in capturing the new ringleader of the Jerusalem Brigade and promising to tell Rami who the real killer of the soldier was in exchange for a gun. Omar then tells the ringleader about Amjad but gets agreement that Omar is to be the one who deals with him. Meeting Rami, with three other Israeli agents, Rami gives Omar a gun but Omar uses it to kill Rami.

Production 
Director Hany Abu-Assad describes putting together the idea of the film in one night, writing the structure of the story in four hours and writing the script in four days. After a year of securing finance, filming began at the end of 2012 and took place mainly in Nazareth Nablus and the Far'a refugee camp.

Waleed Zuaiter managed to secure the $2m budget for the film, 5% of which came from Enjaaz, the post-production fund of Dubai International Film Festival and the remainder from Palestinians.

Distribution 
Adopt Films acquired all U.S. rights to Omar after its premier at the Cannes Film Festival. UK distribution rights was acquired by Soda Pictures and distribution rights in France was sold to Pretty Pictures.

Reception

Critical response
Omar has an approval rating of 90% on review aggregator website Rotten Tomatoes, based on 87 reviews, and an average rating of 7.46/10.The website's critical consensus states, "Twisty and riveting, Omar is a well-directed crime drama with uncommon depth". It also has a score of 75 out of 100 on Metacritic, based on 28 critics, indicating "generally favorable reviews".

Awards

See also 
 List of submissions to the 86th Academy Awards for Best Foreign Language Film
 List of Palestinian submissions for the Academy Award for Best Foreign Language Film

References

External links 
 
 

2013 films
2013 drama films
Palestinian drama films
2010s Arabic-language films
Films directed by Hany Abu-Assad
Israeli–Palestinian conflict films